This is a list of some of the works of the French sculptor and painter Antonin Mercié.

Biography
Marius Jean Antonin Mercié was born in Toulouse and attended the École des Beaux-Arts in Paris where he studied under François Jouffroy and Alexandre Falguière.  In 1868, he won the Prix de Rome with the composition Thésée vainqueur du Minotaure.

In 1872, and whilst working in Rome, courtesy of the Prix de Rome, he submitted the work entitled David vainqueur du Goliath to the Paris Salon and this won him the Salon's "medaiile de première classe".  By 1874 Mercié's fame was growing and in that year he submitted the work Gloria Victis (Gloire aux Vaincus) to the Salon and this enjoyed great success.  In this composition Mercié marked the defeat of 1870 but glorified the patriotism and heroism of the French soldiers. Gloria Victis has been used on many monuments.

Antonin Mercié was to produce a number of works with the theme of patriotism.  The enigmatic Quand meme!  used on the Belfort memorial and the work Jeanne d'Arc relevant l'épée de 1a France were two such works.

From 1880 onwards he practiced also as a painter and was made Professor of design and sculpture at the École des Beaux Arts where he was to inspire many artists including Constantin Brâncuși.  In 1891 he entered the Institut français and in 1913 was made President of the Société des artistes français.

Mercié is regarded as having been a member of the group known as the "École toulousaine" along with Laurent Marqueste (1848–1920), Victor Segoffin (1867–1925), Jean-Marie Mengue (1855–1949) and Auguste Seysses (1862–1946).  Alexandre Falguière was regarded as the group's leader.

List of principal works

Gallery

References

External links 

Lists of works of art